State Route 138 is a highway,  completely within Tooele County in northern Utah that connects Grantsville to Erda and Stansbury Park. The route runs twenty miles (32 km) and is the old routing of U.S. Route 50 Alternate and U.S. Route 40.

Route description
From its western terminus at exit 84 of I-80, northeast of the Stansbury Mountains, the route heads southwest (toward the mountain range), reaching the mining operation of Flux, then turns southeasterly. Upon entering the western side of Grantsville, the highway heads east (serving as Grantsville's Main Street) and turns to the northeast after leaving the city. It runs northeasterly until terminating at Mills Junction north of Stansbury Park, at milepost 62.9 of Highway 36.

With the exception of the segment between SR-112 and Sheep Lane, the route is included in the National Highway System.

History

Previous route
When it was first formed in 1933, SR-138 took a similar path to the present-day route, going from Grantsville north to Burmester. This designation was deleted in 1953.

Current route
The current route of SR-138 was formed in 1965, when SR-2 was moved to the north to reflect the future alignment of then under-construction I-80. The state legislature wanted to keep the old alignment of looping down to Grantsville in the state highway system, so it was re-designated as SR-138. This designation has remained the same since that action.

In the May 2018 meeting of the Utah Transportation Commission, a motion passed to truncate the east end SR-138 to the future Tooele Midvalley Highway (SR-179). However, this is contingent on the completion of the segment of SR-179 between SR-138 and I-80, which has not begun construction.

Major intersections

References

138
 138
Utah State Route 138
Utah State Route 138
Utah State Route 138